Rav Tzvi (Zvi Paltiel) Berkowitz is an Orthodox  rabbi, Talmudist, and Maggid Shiur (lecturer) at Yeshivas Ner Yisroel (Ner Israel Rabbinical College), Baltimore, Maryland, in the United States, and teaches the highest-level Talmud shiur.

Personal and professional life
Born in San Francisco to Holocaust survivors of Gerrer Hasidic descent, he went to study at Ner Israel Yeshiva at a young age. He married Ettil Kamenetsky, daughter of Rabbi Shmuel Kamenetsky, Dean of the Talmudical Yeshiva of Philadelphia and member of the American Moetzes Gedolei HaTorah of Agudath Israel of America. Ettil is a granddaughter of Rav Yaakov Kamenetsky.

In the world of the Haredi Lithuanian yeshivas the rabbinical scholar who is appointed to the position of highest-level lecturer in a yeshiva is second only to that of the rosh yeshiva (Dean). The Ner Israel Rabbinical College is one of the oldest and most prestigious yeshivas in the United States, making Rabbi Berkowitz one of the most prominent lecturers of Talmud in the United States.

In American Jewish Orthodoxy

Rabbi Berkowitz serves in a variety of additional functions both within and outside of Ner Israel. Rabbi Berkowitz also serves on the faculty of Ohr Nissan Talmud Center devoted to the Torah education of Iranian Jews under the auspices of the Ner Israel yeshiva.

Rabbi Berkowitz is a frequent guest speaker in Baltimore and other cities, such as Atlanta, Minneapolis and in various parts of New York as in Far Rockaway, and Lawrence where he was described as follows:
Rabbi Berkowitz delivers the most advanced shiur in the yeshiva and is respected throughout the yeshiva world for his scholarship and insight. Many bachurim [male students] are attracted to Ner Israel because of the opportunity to attend his shiur [lectures]. He maintains close ties with alumni, many of whom live in the Five Towns area. It is typical for alumni who have been out of the yeshiva for years to consult with Rav Berkowitz on a regular basis.

Influence

Rabbi Berkowitz has influenced other younger rabbis, who quote him authoritatively in their writings, such Dovid Rosenfeld, Doniel Frank, or have noted his educational influence on themselves, such as recent authors of Orthodox religious Judaica: Dov Moshe Lipman, Avi Fertig and on those active as Torah educators and leaders, such as:

Rabbi Jeffrey Greenberg... Dean of Ateres Naava Seminary, previously TBY seminary in Queens. He was the Director of New York NCSY for 20 years...attended Ner Israel in Baltimore, where he received Smicha, attaining a close relationship with his Rav, Rav Tzvi Berkowitz.

References

American Haredi rabbis
American people of Polish-Jewish descent
Ger (Hasidic dynasty)
Living people
Year of birth missing (living people)
Yeshivas Ner Yisroel
Rabbis from Baltimore